Yuval Sznajderman (born December 9, 2002) is an Israeli professional basketball player for Hapoel Gilboa Galil of the Israeli Basketball Premier League. He plays the point guard position. Sznajderman played for the Israeli national team during the 2021 FIBA U20 European Challengers.

Biography
Sznajderman is 6-1 (185 cm) tall, and weighs 180 pounds (82 kg).

In 2020-21, Sznajderman played for Hapoel Jerusalem and averaged 1.7 points, 1.3 rebounds, 0.4 assists, and 6.8 minutes per game.

In 2021-22, he played for Hapoel Jerusalem and Maccabi Rishon Lezion and averaged 3.4 points, 1.4 rebounds, 0.3 assists, and 10.4 minutes per game.

International play
In 2021, Sznajderman played for Team Israel in the FIBA U20 Euro Challengers.

References

External links
Yuval Sznajderman at RealGM
Basketball Champions League profile
basket.co.il profile
EuroBasket profile
Balkan League profile

2002 births
Living people
Point guards
Israeli men's basketball players
Hapoel Jerusalem B.C. players
Maccabi Rishon LeZion basketball players